The 2023 Nigerian presidential election in Zamfara State will be held on 25 February 2023 as part of the nationwide 2023 Nigerian presidential election to elect the president and vice president of Nigeria. Other federal elections, including elections to the House of Representatives and the Senate, will also be held on the same date while state elections will be held two weeks afterward on 11 March.

Background
Zamfara State is highly populated northwestern state mainly inhabited by ethnic Hausas and Fulanis. In the years before the election, the state was beset by the bandit conflict along with herder–farmer clashes and the nationwide kidnapping epidemic as bandits raid entire towns, kidnap school children, and attack motorists.

Politically, the 2019 elections were initially a continuation of the state APC's dominance as the party's presidential nominee Muhammadu Buhari won the state by over 50% and the party won all three senate seats while also sweeping the House of Representatives elections. On the state level, the APC also retained its House of Assembly majority and its gubernatorial nominee—Mukhtar Shehu Idris—won the gubernatorial election by a wide margin. However, right before inaugurations, the Supreme Court ruled that the Zamfara APC did not hold valid primaries and thus all of its candidates—other then Buhari, who was nominated nationally—were disqualified.

Polling

Projections

General election

Results

By senatorial district 
The results of the election by senatorial district.

By federal constituency
The results of the election by federal constituency.

By local government area 
The results of the election by local government area.

See also 
 2023 Nigerian elections
 2023 Nigerian presidential election

Notes

References 

Zamfara State gubernatorial election
2023 Zamfara State elections
Zamfara